Juan Gomez (born 25 January 1971 in Argentina) is an Argentinean retired footballer.

References

1971 births
Argentine footballers
Living people
Association football defenders
Association football midfielders
Argentinos Juniors footballers
Real Sociedad footballers
Club Atlético River Plate footballers
Atlético Madrid footballers